Guillaume Dah Zadi (born 1 January 1978) is a former Ivorian footballer who played as a forward.

Zadi's former clubs include Africa Sports d'Abidjan, Satellite FC Abidjan, USM Annaba, Wydad Casablanca, EOG Kram, CSKA Sofia and Changchun Yatai.

References

External links
 

1978 births
Living people
Ivorian footballers
Ivory Coast international footballers
Ivorian expatriate footballers
First Professional Football League (Bulgaria) players
Wydad AC players
USM Annaba players
EO Goulette et Kram players
PFC CSKA Sofia players
Changchun Yatai F.C. players
Chinese Super League players
Expatriate footballers in Algeria
Expatriate footballers in Bulgaria
Expatriate footballers in China
Expatriate footballers in Tunisia
Ivorian expatriate sportspeople in Algeria
Ivorian expatriate sportspeople in Tunisia
Ivorian expatriate sportspeople in Bulgaria
Ivorian expatriate sportspeople in China
Footballers from Abidjan
Association football forwards